Treneere Manor is a Grade II* listed small mansion near Penzance, Cornwall, built in 1758. It is owned by Truro and Penwith College to accommodate the Penwith campus administration.

References 

Houses in Cornwall
Buildings and structures in Penzance
Grade II* listed buildings in Cornwall